Vitor Gabriel Reis Guimaraes (born 11 March 2006) is a Brazilian footballer who plays as a right-back for Atlético Mineiro.

Club career
Vitor Reis made his professional debut for Atlético Mineiro on 8 February 2023, coming on as a half-time substitute for Mariano in a 3–0 win over Democrata-SL.

International career
Reis has represented Brazil at under-16 level. He represented Brazil at the 2022 Montaigu Tournament, where he was praised for his performances.

He has also been called up to the under-17 side, and was called up for the 2023 South American U-17 Championship.

Career statistics

Club

References

2006 births
Living people
Brazilian footballers
Brazil youth international footballers
Association football fullbacks
Clube Atlético Mineiro players